God-fearers (phoboumenoi ton Theon) or God-worshippers (Theosebeis) were a numerous class of Gentile sympathizers to Hellenistic Judaism that existed in the Greco-Roman world, which observed certain Jewish religious rites and traditions without becoming full converts to Judaism. The concept has precedents in the proselytes of the Hebrew Bible.

Many of these Greco-Roman sympathizers to Hellenistic Judaism, which had a monotheistic or henotheistic Pagan background, were worshippers of Caelus (the Roman name/equivalent to Yahweh). Some modern scholars of Judaic studies, such as A. Thomas Kraabel, believe the God-fearers named in the New Testament (such as Cornelius the Centurion) to be a fictional invention of the Acts of the Apostles. More generally,  has come to mean someone who is honestly religious.

Overview

Origin, history, status and diffusion

Since the mid-1980s, a growing number of scholars of Judaic studies and history of Judaism became interested in the subject of God-fearers and their relationship with Hellenistic Judaism and early Christianity. According to the popular opinion, Jews that lived in the Greco-Roman world during the Hellenistic and Roman period were not involved in active missionary efforts of mass conversion among Pagans, although many historians disagree.

As Jews emigrated and settled in the Roman provinces of the Empire, Judaism became an appealing religion to a number of Pagans, for many reasons; God-fearers and proselytes that underwent full conversion were Greeks or Romans, and came from all social classes: they were mostly women and freedmen (liberti), but there were also artisans, soldiers and few people of high status, like patricians and senators. Despite their allegiance to Judaism, the God-fearers were exempted from paying the "Jewish tax" (fiscus Judaicus).

The class of God-fearers existed between the 1st and the 3rd century CE. They are mentioned in Latin and Greek literature, Flavius Josephus' and Philo's historical works, rabbinic literature, early Christian writings, and other contemporary sources such as synagogue inscriptions from Diaspora communities (Palestine, Rome, and Asia Minor).

In the Ancient Greek theatre of Miletus, some sitting places seem to have been reserved for the God fearer.

Sources

Hebrew Bible
In the Hebrew Bible, there is some recognition of Gentile monotheistic worship as being directed toward the God of the Jews. This forms the category of yir’ei HaShem/yir’ei Shamayim (meaning "Fearers of the Name"/"Fearers of Heaven", "the Name" being a Jewish euphemism for Yahweh, cf. Psalm ). This was developed by later rabbinic literature into the concept of Noahides, i. e. Gentiles that follow the Seven Laws of Noah, which rabbinic writings assigned to the Noahic Covenant.

In inscriptions, texts and papyri
The Greek and Latin terms that refer to God-fearers (theosebeis, sebomenoi, phoboumenoi, metuentes) are found in ancient literature (Greek, Roman, and Jewish) and synagogue inscriptions discovered in Aphrodisias, Panticapaeum, Tralles, Sardis, Venosa, Lorium (in Rome), Rhodes, Deliler (Philadelphia) and Miletus.

Judging from the distinctions in the Acts of the Apostles, it is thought that they did not become gerim tzedekim, which required circumcision, although the evidence across the centuries varies widely and the meaning of the term may have included all kinds of sympathetic Gentiles, proselytes or not. There are also around 300 text references (4th century BCE to 3rd century CE) to a sect of Hypsistarians, some of whom practiced Sabbath and which many scholars see as sympathizers with Judaism related to God-fearers.

In early Christian writings

In the New Testament and early Christian writings, the Greek terms God-fearers and God-worshippers are used to indicate those Pagans who attached themselves in varying degrees to Hellenistic Judaism without becoming full converts, and are referred to primarily in the Gospel of Luke and more extensively in the Acts of the Apostles, which describes the Apostolic Age of the 1st century.

Role in 1st-century Christianity

Judaizing Gentiles and God-fearers are considered by modern scholars to be of significant importance to the growth of early Christianity; they represented a group of Gentiles who shared religious ideas and practices with Jews, to one degree or another. However, the God-fearers were only "partial" converts, engaged in certain Jewish rites and traditions without taking a step further to actual conversion to Judaism, which would have required full adherence to the 613 Mitzvot (including various prohibitions such as kashrut, circumcision, Shabbat observance, etc.) that were generally unattractive to would-be Gentile (largely Greek) converts. The rite of circumcision was especially unappealing and execrable in Classical civilization because it was the custom to spend an hour a day or so exercising nude in the gymnasium and in Roman baths, therefore Jewish men did not want to be seen in public deprived of their foreskins. Hellenistic and Roman culture both found circumcision to be cruel and repulsive.

The Apostle Paul in his letters fiercely criticized the Judaizers that demanded circumcision for Gentile converts, and opposed them; he stressed instead that faith in Christ constituted a New Covenant with God, a covenant which essentially provides the justification and salvation for Gentiles from the harsh edicts of the Mosaic Law, a New Covenant that didn't require circumcision (see also Justification by faith, Pauline passages supporting antinomianism, Abrogation of Old Covenant laws). Lydia of Thyatira, who became Paul's first convert to Christianity in Europe, is described in the New Testament as "a worshipper of God"; the Roman soldier Cornelius and the Ethiopian eunuch are also considered by modern scholars as God-fearers who converted to Christianity.

In Paul's message of salvation through faith in Christ as opposed to submission under the Mosaic Law, many God-fearers found an essentially Jewish group to which they could belong without the necessity of their accepting Jewish Law. Aside from earning Paul's group a wide following, this view was generalized in the eventual conclusion that converts to Christianity need not first accept all Jewish Law (see Apostolic Decree), a fact indispensable to the spread of the early Christians which would eventually lead to the distinction between Judaism and Christianity as two separate religions.

See also

 Anti-Judaism in early Christianity
 Biblical law in Christianity
 Council of Jerusalem
 Decline of Greco-Roman polytheism
 Dual-covenant theology
 Fear of God
 Generations of Noah
 Ger toshav
 Jewish Christians
 New Perspective on Paul
 Noahidism
 Religion in ancient Rome
 Sabians
 Split of early Christianity and Judaism
 Supersessionism

Notes and references

External links
Catholic Encyclopedia: Proselyte mentions "fearers of God"
A. Chaniotis, "Godfearers in the City of Love" , Biblical Archaeology Review 36, 3 (2010), Biblical Archaeology Society
Louis H. Feldman, “The Omnipresence of the God-Fearers”, Biblical Archaeology Review 12, 5 (1986), Center for Online Judaic Studies
A. Guttmacher, "Fear of God" (1906), Jewish Encyclopedia

1st-century Christianity
Ancient Christian controversies
Jews and Judaism in the Roman Empire
Biblical phrases
Early Christianity and Judaism
Hellenistic Judaism
Mosaic law in Christian theology
New Testament words and phrases
Noahides
People in Acts of the Apostles